The Bituriges Vivisci (Gaulish: Biturīges Uiuisci) were a Gallic tribe dwelling near modern-day Bordeaux during the Roman period. They had a homonym tribe, the Bituriges Cubi in the Berry region, which could indicate a common origin, although there is no direct of evidence of this.

Name 
They are mentioned as Bitourígōn te tō͂n Ou̓iouískōn (Βιτουρίγων τε τῶν Οὐιουίσκων) by Strabo (early 1st c. AD), Bituriges liberi cognomine Vivisci by Pliny (1st c. AD), and as Bitoúrges oi̔ Ou̓ibískoi (Βιτούργες οἱ Οὐιβίσκοι) by Ptolemy (2nd c. AD).

The Gaulish ethnonym Biturīges means 'kings of the world', or possibly 'perpetual kings'. It derives from the stem bitu- ('world', perhaps also 'perpetual'; cf. OIr. bith 'world, life, age', bith- 'eternally', Old Welsh bid, OBret. bit 'world') attached to riges ('kings'; sing. rix). Whether the meaning 'perpetual' was already associated with bitu- in ancient Celtic languages or appeared later in Old Irish remains uncertain. In any case, the meaning 'world' probably emerged from the notion of 'living world, place of the livings', since the Proto-Celtic stem *bitu- derives from Proto-Indo-European *gʷiH-tu-, meaning 'life' (cf. Lat. vīta 'life', OCS žiti 'to live').

Geography 
The Bituriges Vivisci dwelled in the modern  region, between the Garonne (Garumna) river and the Atlantic ocean. Their territory was located west of the Petrocorii, south of the Santones, northwest of the Nitiobroges and Cadurci, and east of the smaller Medulli.

Their port (emporium) and chief town was Burdigala (Bordeaux).

Writing in the early 1st century AD, Strabo describes them as the only Gallic tribe dwelling among the Aquitani, which suggests a relatively late coming to the region. According to historian Venceslas Kruta, they may have settled in their attested homeland as a result of the Gallic Wars (58–50 BC), for their presence is not mentioned by Caesar.

See also
 Bituriges Cubi
 List of peoples of Gaul

References

Primar sources

Bibliography 

 
 
 
 
 
 

Historical Celtic peoples
Gauls
Tribes of pre-Roman Gaul
Bordeaux